Edenville Dam was an earthen embankment dam at the confluence of the Tittabawassee River and the Tobacco River in Mid Michigan, United States, forming Wixom Lake.

The dam was built in 1924 for hydroelectric power and flood control. The dam was equipped with two 2.4 MW turbines capable of generating 4.8 MW of electricity in total.

In May 2020, following heavy rains, the Edenville Dam breached and the Sanford Dam downstream overflowed, which caused major flooding in Midland County, including the city of Midland.

History
The dam was built in 1924 by Frank Isaac Wixom, after whom the reservoir formed by the dam is named. Wixom used to own a circus before he built the dam.

The dam is privately owned and operated by Boyce Hydro Power, a company based in Edenville, which also owned three other hydroelectric facilities on the Tittabawassee: the Secord, Smallwood, and Sanford Dams.

Safety and lake level disputes
In a rarely used federal power, the Federal Energy Regulatory Commission (FERC) terminated Boyce Hydro Power's license in 2018, because of its "inability to pass the Probable Maximum Flood (PMF)", as well as seven other failures. The federal government was concerned that "the dam may not have the ability to pass enough water, if a severe flood were to hit, among other issues and violations."

Following the federal government's 2018 license revocation, the Michigan Department of Environment, Great Lakes, and Energy (EGLE) took oversight of the dam. EGLE determined that the dam was structurally sound. Edenville and the other former Boyce dams were taken over in 2019 by the Four Lakes Task Force, a county delegated authority, with title to transfer in early 2022. The State of Michigan appropriated $5 million for the purchase. The Four Lakes Task Force operates under the Four Lakes Assessment District in the State of Michigan, created in May 2019 by Judge Stephen Carras. In 2019, Michigan's 42nd Circuit Court was involved in determining if only the lakefront owners or all area residents would pay tax to the Four Lakes Assessment District.

In October 2018, and again in mid-November 2019, the dam's operator lowered the water level, in what it called a safety move.  It said it had requested a permit to lower the level from Michigan's EGLE, a permit that was not issued.  The operator said it acted “due to concern for the safety of its operators and the downstream community,” and went on to sue EGLE in federal court, alleging "its safety concerns were paramount."

In December 2019, the Federal Energy Regulatory Commission issued a permit to investigate expanding the hydropower plant with a second powerhouse containing one 1.2 MW turbine-generator unit for a total of 6 MW.

The dam's operator said it began to raise the lake's water level in April 2020, under threat of being sued by Michigan's EGLE, and that it reached "normal pond level" in the first week of May 2020.  Michigan's Attorney General Dana Nessel confirmed EGLE had directed the operator to raise the water level, stating: "Michigan EGLE directed Boyce to follow the court-ordered lake level requirements," but challenged that the operator had lowered it for safety reasons.

In April 2020, EGLE sued Boyce, alleging it had lowered the water level without permission in 2018 and 2019, killing thousands of freshwater mussels.

In October 2022, however, a federal judge accepted as basic facts that Boyce had conducted what the Michigan Attorney General called a "propaganda" campaign trying to blame the State of Michigan for keeping water levels high, when in fact, Boyce had continually touted the structural safety of the Edenville Dam.

Dam failure

On May 19, 2020, 5:46 p.m., due to massive inflow from heavy rains in the area, the eastern side of the dam collapsed, prompting immediate evacuations in the towns of Edenville and Sanford. Governor Gretchen Whitmer declared a state of emergency, and announced an investigation into the dam's operators for alleged neglect. Over 10,000 local residents were ultimately evacuated, as officials  cautioned residents to maintain social distancing during the COVID-19 pandemic.

The Tittabawassee River crested at  late on May 20, resulting in extensive flooding throughout eastern Midland and low-lying parts of its downtown district, and severely damaging most of the village of Sanford. The extent of the floodwaters could be clearly seen in satellite imagery on May 22. Dow Chemical's Midland operations were threatened by the flooding, but reportedly suffered no serious damage. As of the morning of May 20, no casualties had been reported as a result of the flooding.

Lawsuits

In the wake of the flooding, three class-action lawsuits were filed by the victims, of which two named Michigan's EGLE as defendant and two named the dam's operator as defendant. Michigan's Attorney General Dana Nessel is also being sued.

Forensic Report
The Federal Energy Regulatory Commission appointed an Independent Forensic Team (IFT) of expert engineers to examine the failure and issue an expert opinion on the cause. Their final report was issued on 4 May 2022, and determined that the cause was “foreseeable and preventable,” and resulted from multiple errors committed over nearly a century. They reported the dam was improperly designed, and that it was also improperly constructed, resulting in built-in flaws that doomed it from the start. "The IFT understands the natural desire to place 'blame' for the failure. However, the IFT found that the failure cannot reasonably be attributed to any one individual, group, or organization. Instead, it was the overall system for financing, designing, constructing, operating, evaluating, and upgrading the four dams, involving many parties during the nearly 100 years of project history, which fell short in ensuring a safe dam at the Edenville site."

The IFT found that neither internal erosion nor overtopping caused the failure. Instead the IFT believes loose sands, inside a portion of the dam, became saturated with water, which led to their static liquefaction which is a sudden loss of strength. (p. S-4) The use of sand in the original construction was a significant deviation from the construction specifications in the original plans. (p. S-5)

The part of the embankment that failed was constructed with steep slopes on the downstream side. These steep slopes violated safety requirements that were in place for many years prior to the failure. 

During multiple inspections of the dam, and analyses of the current structural integrity of the dam, over a period spanning more than 90 years, these two major flaws were not reported. Both could have been fixed.

Repair 
A $4.8 billion infrastructure plan was approved by Michigan Gov. Gretchen Whitmer in March 2022. A portion of the approved funds are to be used to repair the dam.

A somewhat unexpected side effect of the dam failure was the creation of a waterfall downstream of the dam breach along the new river path. At 5-10 feet tall, Edenville Falls was the tallest waterfall in the Lower Peninsula. As part of the dam reconstruction, the Tittabawassee River has been redirected back through the spillway and the old river path, resulting in Edenville Falls drying up.

References

Energy infrastructure completed in 1925
Dams in Michigan
Reservoirs in Michigan
Buildings and structures in Gladwin County, Michigan
Earth-filled dams
Hydroelectric power plants in Michigan
Dams completed in 1925
United States power company dams
Bodies of water of Gladwin County, Michigan
Dam failures in the United States
United States privately owned dams